The Portuguese local elections of 1979 took place on 16 December. They were the 2nd local elections in Portugal since the democratic revolution of 1974 introduced the concept of democratic local power. The elections took place just two weeks after the 1979 legislative election.

The elections consisted of three separate elections in the 305 Portuguese municipalities, the election for the Municipal Chambers, whose winner is elected president, another election for the Municipal Assembly and a last one for the lower-level Parish Assembly, whose winner is elected parish president, this last was held separately in the more than 4,000 parishes around the country.

The Socialist Party finished on the top of the results table, however that was because the coalition between the two major right-wing parties, the Democratic and Social Center and the Social Democratic Party, the Democratic Alliance, did not participated in all Municipalities and Parishes, being the parties which composed it, separated in many Municipalities

The left-wing United People Alliance dominated the election in the municipalities of the South of the country, gathering more than 60% of the voting.

Turnout in these elections increased compared with the 1976 election, as 71.7% of the electorate cast a ballot, the highest turnout recorded in a nationwide local election.

Parties 
The main political forces involved in the election were:

 Democratic Alliance (AD) (only in some municipalities)
 Democratic and Social Center (CDS) (only in some municipalities)
 Socialist Party (PS)
 Social Democratic Party (PSD) (only in some municipalities)
 United People Alliance (APU)

Results

Municipal Councils

National summary of votes and seats

|-
! rowspan="2" colspan=2 style="background-color:#E9E9E9" align=left|Parties
! rowspan="2" style="background-color:#E9E9E9" align=right|Votes
! rowspan="2" style="background-color:#E9E9E9" align=right|%
! rowspan="2" style="background-color:#E9E9E9" align=right|Candidacies
! colspan="2" style="background-color:#E9E9E9" align="center"|Councillors
! colspan="2" style="background-color:#E9E9E9" align="center"|Mayors
|- style="background-color:#E9E9E9"
! style="background-color:#E9E9E9" align="center"|Total
! style="background-color:#E9E9E9" align="center"|±
! style="background-color:#E9E9E9" align="center"|Total
! style="background-color:#E9E9E9" align="center"|±
|-
| 
|align=right| 1,258,966
|align=right| 28.33
|align=right| 297
|align=right| 516
|align=right|175
|align=right| 60
|align=right|55
|-
|style="width: 10px" bgcolor=#2A52BE align="center" | 
|align=left|Democratic Alliance
|align=right| 1,044,642
|align=right| 23.51
|align=right| 138
|align=right| 426 
|align=right|—
|align=right| 73
|align=right|—
|-  
| 
|align=right| 885,899 	  	
|align=right| 19.94
|align=right| 295
|align=right| 316
|align=right| 48
|align=right| 50
|align=right|13
|-
| 
|align=right| 723,953
|align=right| 16.29
|align=right| 156
|align=right| 475 
|align=right|149
|align=right| 101
|align=right|14
|-
| 
|align=right| 334,258
|align=right| 7.52
|align=right| 102
|align=right| 156 
|align=right|161
|align=right| 20
|align=right|16
|-
|style="width: 10px" bgcolor=#E2062C align="center" | 
|align=left|People's Democratic Union
|align=right| 53,076 	
|align=right| 1.19
|align=right| 95
|align=right|3 
|align=right|—
|align=right| 0
|align=right|—
|-
| 
|align=right| 19,508  	  	
|align=right| 0.44
|align=right| 63
|align=right| 0
|align=right| 0
|align=right| 0
|align=right|0
|-
| 
|align=right| 6,631 	
|align=right| 0.15
|align=right| 9
|align=right| 2 
|align=right|—
|align=right| 0
|align=right|—
|-
| 
|align=right| 6,219 	
|align=right| 0.14
|align=right| 3
|align=right| 6 
|align=right|3
|align=right| 1
|align=right|0
|-
| 
|align=right| 1,882
|align=right| 0.04
|align=right| 7
|align=right| 0 
|align=right|—
|align=right| 0
|align=right|—
|-
| 
|align=right| 273
|align=right| 0.01
|align=right| 2
|align=right| 0 
|align=right|—
|align=right| 0
|align=right|—
|-
|colspan=2 align=left style="background-color:#E9E9E9"|Total valid
|width="65" align="right" style="background-color:#E9E9E9"|4,271,897
|width="40" align="right" style="background-color:#E9E9E9"|97.56
|width="40" align="right" style="background-color:#E9E9E9"|—
|width="45" align="right" style="background-color:#E9E9E9"|1,900
|width="45" align="right" style="background-color:#E9E9E9"|8
|width="45" align="right" style="background-color:#E9E9E9"|305
|width="45" align="right" style="background-color:#E9E9E9"|1
|-
|colspan=2|Blank ballots
|44,693||1.01||colspan=6 rowspan=4|
|-
|colspan=2|Invalid ballots
|63,679||1.43
|-
|colspan=2 align=left style="background-color:#E9E9E9"|Total
|width="65" align="right" style="background-color:#E9E9E9"|4,380,269
|width="40" align="right" style="background-color:#E9E9E9"|100.00
|-
|colspan=2|Registered voters/turnout
||6,105,651||71.74
|-
| colspan=9 align=left|In 1976, as Electoral Front United People.
|}

Municipality map

City control
The following table lists party control in all district capitals, as well as in municipalities above 100,000 inhabitants. Population estimates from the 1970 Census.

Municipal Assemblies

National summary of votes and seats

|-
! rowspan="2" colspan=2 style="background-color:#E9E9E9" align=left|Parties
! rowspan="2" style="background-color:#E9E9E9" align=right|Votes
! rowspan="2" style="background-color:#E9E9E9" align=right|%
! rowspan="2" style="background-color:#E9E9E9" align=right|Candidacies
! colspan="2" style="background-color:#E9E9E9" align="center"|Mandates
|- style="background-color:#E9E9E9"
! style="background-color:#E9E9E9" align="center"|Total
! style="background-color:#E9E9E9" align="center"|±
|-
| 
|align=right| 1,245,306  	
|align=right| 27.86
|align=right| 
|align=right| 2,686
|align=right| 988
|-
|style="width: 10px" bgcolor=#2A52BE align="center" | 
|align=left|Democratic Alliance
|align=right| 1,056,656
|align=right| 23.64
|align=right| 
|align=right| 2,122
|align=right|—
|-  
| 
|align=right| 916,990  	
|align=right| 20.51
|align=right| 
|align=right| 1,746
|align=right|1,067
|-
| 
|align=right| 747,911
|align=right| 16.73
|align=right| 
|align=right| 2,230 
|align=right|572
|-
| 
|align=right| 308,721
|align=right| 6.91
|align=right| 
|align=right| 832
|align=right|221
|-
|style="width: 10px" bgcolor=#E2062C align="center" | 
|align=left|People's Democratic Union
|align=right| 55,794  	
|align=right| 1.25
|align=right| 
|align=right| 58
|align=right|—
|-
| 
|align=right| 10,783  	  	  	
|align=right| 0.24
|align=right|  
|align=right| 0
|align=right|0
|-
| 
|align=right| 5,578  	
|align=right| 0.12
|align=right| 
|align=right| 26
|align=right| 24
|-
| 
|align=right| 596  	
|align=right| 0.01
|align=right|
|align=right| 3 
|align=right|—
|-
| 
|align=right| 417
|align=right| 0.00
|align=right| 
|align=right| 0
|align=right|0
|-
|colspan=2 align=left style="background-color:#E9E9E9"|Total valid
|width="65" align="right" style="background-color:#E9E9E9"|4,266,013
|width="40" align="right" style="background-color:#E9E9E9"|97.28
|width="40" align="right" style="background-color:#E9E9E9"|—
|width="45" align="right" style="background-color:#E9E9E9"|9,703
|width="45" align="right" style="background-color:#E9E9E9"|4,568
|-
|colspan=2|Blank ballots
|59,564||1.33||colspan=6 rowspan=4|
|-
|colspan=2|Invalid ballots
|62,241||1.39
|-
|colspan=2 align=left style="background-color:#E9E9E9"|Total
|width="65" align="right" style="background-color:#E9E9E9"|4,387,818
|width="40" align="right" style="background-color:#E9E9E9"|100.00
|-
|colspan=2|Registered voters/turnout
||6,105,647||71.86
|-
| colspan=9 align=left|In 1976, as Electoral Front United People.
|}

Parish Assemblies

National summary of votes and seats

|-
! rowspan="2" colspan=2 style="background-color:#E9E9E9" align=left|Parties
! rowspan="2" style="background-color:#E9E9E9" align=right|Votes
! rowspan="2" style="background-color:#E9E9E9" align=right|%
! rowspan="2" style="background-color:#E9E9E9" align=right|Candidacies
! colspan="2" style="background-color:#E9E9E9" align="center"|Mandates
! colspan="2" style="background-color:#E9E9E9" align="center"|Presidents
|- style="background-color:#E9E9E9"
! style="background-color:#E9E9E9" align="center"|Total
! style="background-color:#E9E9E9" align="center"|±
! style="background-color:#E9E9E9" align="center"|Total
! style="background-color:#E9E9E9" align="center"|±
|-
| 
|align=right| 1,219,298 	
|align=right| 27.77
|align=right| 
|align=right| 10,613
|align=right| 2,268
|align=right|
|align=right|
|-
|style="width: 10px" bgcolor=#2A52BE align="center" | 
|align=left|Democratic Alliance
|align=right| 1,000,702
|align=right| 22.79
|align=right| 
|align=right| 9,785 
|align=right| —
|align=right|
|align=right|—
|-  
| 
|align=right| 898,670  	   	 	
|align=right| 20.47
|align=right| 
|align=right| 4,732
|align=right| 2,441
|align=right|
|align=right|
|-
| 
|align=right| 736,954  	
|align=right| 16.78
|align=right|
|align=right| 9,447 
|align=right| 371
|align=right|
|align=right|
|-
| 
|align=right| 306,332  	
|align=right| 6.98
|align=right| 
|align=right| 4,661
|align=right| 416
|align=right|
|align=right|
|-
|style="width: 8px" bgcolor=gray align="center" |
|align=left|Independents
|align=right| 49,207  	
|align=right| 1.12
|align=right| 
|align=right| 707 
|align=right| 523
|align=right|
|align=right|
|-
|style="width: 10px" bgcolor=#E2062C align="center" | 
|align=left|People's Democratic Union
|align=right| 41,414
|align=right| 0.94
|align=right| 
|align=right| 55
|align=right| —
|align=right|
|align=right|—
|-
| 
|align=right| 6,010  	
|align=right| 0.14
|align=right| 
|align=right| 3
|align=right| 1
|align=right|
|align=right| 
|-
| 
|align=right| 5,006 	   	
|align=right| 0.12
|align=right| 
|align=right| 78 
|align=right| 66
|align=right|
|align=right| 
|-
| 
|align=right| 2,594
|align=right| 0.06
|align=right| 
|align=right| 26
|align=right| —
|align=right|
|align=right|—
|-
| 
|align=right| 695 	
|align=right| 0.02
|align=right| 
|align=right| 1 
|align=right| —
|align=right|
|align=right|— 
|-
| 
|align=right| 600
|align=right| 0.01
|align=right|
|align=right| 2 
|align=right| —
|align=right|
|align=right|— 
|-
|colspan=2 align=left style="background-color:#E9E9E9"|Total valid
|width="65" align="right" style="background-color:#E9E9E9"|4,141,981
|width="40" align="right" style="background-color:#E9E9E9"|97.19
|width="40" align="right" style="background-color:#E9E9E9"|—
|width="45" align="right" style="background-color:#E9E9E9"|40,110
|width="45" align="right" style="background-color:#E9E9E9"|—
|width="45" align="right" style="background-color:#E9E9E9"| 
|width="45" align="right" style="background-color:#E9E9E9"|—
|-
|colspan=2|Blank ballots
|54,704||1.25||colspan=6 rowspan=4|
|-
|colspan=2|Invalid ballots
|68,502||1.56
|-
|colspan=2 align=left style="background-color:#E9E9E9"|Total
|width="65" align="right" style="background-color:#E9E9E9"|4,265,187
|width="40" align="right" style="background-color:#E9E9E9"|100.00
|-
|colspan=2|Registered voters/turnout
||6,031,266||70.72
|-
| colspan=9 align=left|In 1976, as Electoral Front United People.
|}

Maps

Notes

 The source of the voting data is the Portuguese Electoral Commission

Further Notes:

Democratic Alliance (AD) was composed by the Democratic Social Center (CDS), the Social Democratic Party (PSD) and the People's Monarchist Party (PPM).
Although the PSD, the CDS and the PPM were united in the Democratic Alliance, they appear in the scorecard because they ran separated in several municipalities.
 United People Alliance (APU) was composed by the Portuguese Communist Party (PCP) and the Portuguese Democratic Movement (MDP/CDE).
 The number of candidacies expresses the number of municipalities or parishes in which the party or coalition presented lists.
 The number of mandates expresses the number of municipal deputies in the Municipal Assembly election and the number of parish deputies in the Parish Assembly election.
 The turnout varies because one may choose not to vote for all the organs.

See also
 Politics of Portugal
 List of political parties in Portugal
 Elections in Portugal

References

External links
Comissão Nacional de Eleições

Local elections
1979
Portuguese local elections